Zambales, officially the Province of Zambales (Pangasinan: Luyag/Probinsia na Zambales), is a province in the Philippines located in the Central Luzon region. Its capital is Iba, which is located in the middle of the province. Zambales borders Pangasinan to the north and northeast, Tarlac to the east,
Pampanga to the southeast, Bataan to the south and the South China Sea to the west. The province is noted for its mangoes, which are abundant from January to April.

Zambales does not have a functional airport - the closest functional airport is Clark International Airport in Angeles City in the neighbouring province of Pampanga. Subic Bay International Airport, which is located in Cubi Point (geographically located inside Morong, Bataan) in the Subic Bay Freeport Zone is no longer functional for domestic and international flights.

The Freeport Zone (SBFZ) is host to many tourist attractions which include casinos, parks, malls, beach-side huts, cottages and resorts, as well as historical sites.

Etymology
The province's name came from the word zambal, which is a Hispanized term for Sambali. Sambal refers to the native language spoken by the early Austronesian inhabitants of the area. A contending version states that the name was derived from the word samba, meaning worship, because the Spanish supposedly found the native inhabitants to be highly superstitious; worshipping the spirits of their ancestors.

It could also originate from the word "Zambo", a term used by the Iberian (Spanish and Portuguese) empires to distinguish people of African ethnicity/descent. The province is home to the Aetas, the aboriginal people of the Philippines who share Afro-ethnic similarities.

History

Prior to colonization, the Aeta people became the first human population who inhabited what is now Zambales. Due to Malay migration waves, the Tagalog people displaced the Sambal people in southern Luzon, which led to the arrival of the Sambal people into present-day Zambales.

The Spanish first explored the area in 1572, led by Juan de Salcedo. Off Cape Bolinao (now part of Pangasinan), he and his men liberated a Zambal chieftain and his followers from a Chinese pirate ship. This act gained the natives' goodwill. Shortly thereafter, the province was organized. Among the earliest towns founded were Subic (1572), Botolan (1572), Masinloc (1607), Iba (1611), and Santa Cruz (1612).

During the Spanish period, a 1774 map was made, which clearly named Scarborough Shoals as Panacot Shoal, a feature under complete sovereignty of Spanish Philippines, specifically of Zambales. The shoal's current name was chosen by Captain Philip D'Auvergne, whose East India Company East Indiaman Scarborough briefly grounded on one of the rocks on 12 September 1784, before sailing on to China. When the Philippines was granted independence in the 19th century and 20th century, Scarborough Shoal was passed by the colonial governments to the sovereign Republic of the Philippines.

Masinloc became the province's first capital. However, the capital was moved among the last three towns above during its history before finally settling in Iba, due to its strategic location. Seven of the province's original northern towns, which included Bolinao, Infanta, San Isidro, now Burgos, Anda, Bani, Agno and Alaminos were later transferred under the jurisdiction of Pangasinan because of their distance from the capital. The first civil governor of Zambales during the colonial American era was Potenciano Lesaca from 1901 to 1903. During the dictatorship of Ferdinand Marcos, Zambales was one of the most militarized areas in the Philippines as majority of the people were against martial rule. Many opposition Sambals were detained, tortured, killed, electrocuted at the genitalia, or were listed as 'missing'. The province was one of the main supporters of the People Power Revolution in Manila, which topped the 21-year dictatorship and installed Corazon Aquino as president, bringing back democracy to the country. The province was heavily affected by the 1991 eruption of Mount Pinatubo. Due to this, the economy of the province weakened for some time, but regained vitality a few years after the government ordered the revitalization of the province and established growth in its southern towns, which later became a significant economic zone in the country by 1995.

The 2012 Scarborough Shoal standoff led to a situation where access to the shoal was restricted by the People's Republic of China. However, in 2016, following meetings between the Philippine president Duterte and his PRC counterparts, the PRC allowed Filipino fishermen to access the shoals for fishing.

In 2018, it was revealed that for every 3,000 peso worth of fish catch by Sambal fisherfolks, China siphoned them in exchange for 'two bottles of mineral water' worth 20 pesos. The revelations led to public unrest against China and the Duterte-administered Philippine government. Filipino president Rodrigo Duterte fired back against his fellow Filipinos, including those from Zambales, saying that China's acts were 'fine' as they were 'only barter'. On June 14, 2018, China's destruction of Scarborough Shoal's reefs surged to an extent which they became visible via Google Earth and Philippine satellites, as confirmed by the University of the Philippines Diliman.

Geography

Zambales lies on the western shores of Luzon island along the South China Sea. Its shoreline is rugged and features many coves and inlets. The Zambales Mountains in the eastern length of the province occupies about 60% of the total land area of Zambales. Subic Bay, at the southern end of the province, provides a natural harbor, and was the location of the U.S. Naval Base Subic Bay until its closure in 1992.

The summit and crater lake of Mount Pinatubo lies within Botolan municipality in Zambales, near the tripoint of Zambales, Pampanga and Tarlac provinces. This volcano, once considered dormant, erupted violently in June 1991.

Climate
Zambales has two pronounced seasons: dry from October to June, and wet from July to September.

Administrative divisions
Zambales comprises 13 municipalities and 1 highly urbanized city, which are divided into two legislative districts. Olongapo City is a highly urbanized city and administers itself autonomously from the province. Panatag Shoal (Scarborough Shoal) a Philippine-claimed territory, is a designated part of the province.

Barangays

The 13 municipalities and 1 city of the province comprise a total of 247 barangays, with Santa Rita in Olongapo City as the most populous in 2010, and Owaog-Nibloc in Botolan as the least. If cities are excluded, Calapacuan in Subic has the highest population as of 2010.

Demographics

Inhabitants

The Aetas of Mount Pinatubo were the earliest inhabitants of what is now the province of Zambales. They were later displaced by the Sambal, an Austronesian people after whom the province is named. Many Sambal still believe in superstitions and mysteries that have been handed down through the generations.

The Tagalogs, the Ilocanos, the Sambal, the Kapampangans, and the Pangasinans today constitute the five largest ethnic groups in Zambales; these identities may and do, however, overlap with one another due to intermarriage and other factors. Most of the people of southern Zambales are migrants from different parts of the country owing the influx of job opportunities brought on by the U.S Subic Naval Base (San Antonio and Subic) during the American regime of the country. Many people found jobs and permanently settled there. The presence of the Americans greatly influenced the culture and way of life of the inhabitants.

Religion

The people of Zambales are predominantly Roman Catholic (78.22%). A sizeable portion of the population also belongs to the Aglipayan Church (6.12%) and Iglesia ni Cristo (4.89%). The remaining are divided with other Christian groups such as Born-again Christians, United Methodist Church, The Church of Jesus Christ of Latter-day Saints, Jehovah's Witnesses, Seventh-day Adventist, United Church of Christ in the Philippines as well as Non Christians which is usually represented by Muslims.

Town fiestas honoring patron saints are practiced in each parish.

Languages

Sambal, Tagalog, and Ilocano are the three main languages of Zambales. Ilocano has 115,337 native speakers, Sambal has 114,637, and Tagalog has 250,637 (plus 24,995 non-native speakers). More than 119,126 spoke other languages as their parent tongue, such as Kapampangan and Pangasinan, including non-Philippine languages such as English and Hokkien Chinese. About 75 percent of the population speaks and understands English to varying degrees of fluency, and road signs are mostly written in that language.

Economy

Tourism plays a large role in the economy of Zambales. Local and foreign tourist flock its many beaches creating many job opportunities and contributing to the economy. Most of the province is still agricultural but there are considerable industrial zones that provide jobs not just for residents of Zambales but also for neighboring provinces. Mining has recently been booming in Zambales where there is an abundant deposit of Nickel and other minerals.

Zambales is basically an agricultural province. The chief products are rice, mangoes, corn, vegetables, and root crops. Major industries include farming, fishing, and mining.

Festivals and events

 Feast Day of Ina Poon Bato  — January24. The Ina Poón Bató is a purportedly miraculous, syncretised image of the Blessed Virgin Mary. Legend has it that before the arrival of the Spanish in the area sometime in the 17th century, local Aeta peoples had discovered a carved wooden statue on a large rock that they called Apo Apang ("Little Queen") and began worshipping the image. On the arrival of Recollect missionaries in 1607, the natives associated the statue with the Roman Catholic depictions of the Virgin Mary, and the image was subsequently Christianised as Ina Poón Bato ("Mother of the Lord Rock").
 Singkamas Festival and Town Fiesta  — 3rd Week of February
 Town Fiesta  — 
 Pundakit Festival of the Arts  — FebruaryJuly
 Zambales Multi Sports Festival Senakulo — 3rd Week of March
 Panagkakadua-an Festival  - 1st Week of April
 Good Friday  — April
 Foundation Day Celebration  — April10
 Grand Fiesta  — 
 The Dinamulag Festival "Zambales Mango Festival"  — 3rd Tuesday of April The Dinamulag Festival also known as the Zambales Mango Festival is an annual festival held in the province of Zambales in the Philippines to celebrate or encourage bountiful harvest of the province's mangoes. The festival was first held in 1999.
 Paynawen Festival  — 3rd Week of April Paynauen ‘Duyan’ Festival is held every April 25 – May 1 in Iba, Zambales.  It commemorates the provincial capital's founding anniversary (founded in 1611) traces its origin from a Zambal word which means rest or pahingahan – the ancient name of Iba before the Spanish conquistadores founded the village on the shore of the Bancal River in 1611. The festival features photo competition and exhibit, sand sculpture competition, skate boarding, 2-cock derby, carabao race, beauty pageant, kite flying, banca race, boxing tournament, street dancing / Duyan Parade, among other activities.
 Marunggay Festival and Town Fiesta  — Last Week of April
 Domorokdok Festival  — May4
 Laruk Laruk Festival  — Last Week of October
 Binabayani Festival and Town Fiesta  — November30 The Binabayani Festival occurs every November in the city of Masinloc in Zambales. . A dance/play depicting the clash between the Spanish and the Natives of Masinloc or the triumph of Christianity over Paganism. The war dance starts with a procession in the afternoon of November 29 and opens in a mass on November 30. This annual religious festival is celebrated with day long activities in honor of San Andres, the patron saint of Masinloc. Binabayani is a war dance that portrays the battle between the Christian and the Aetas in the town of Masinloc. It is a word that means “bravery”. It is usually featured at the town plaza on the 30th day of November for the public to witness.
 Kaligawan Ha Mayanan  — 
 Olongapo Mardigras  — Last Week of October

Education
There are a number of higher educational institutions in the province. The President Ramon Magsaysay State University (PRMSU), the first state university in the province can be found in Iba. It has also satellite campuses in the municipalities of Santa Cruz, Candelaria, Masinloc, Botolan, San Marcelino, and Castillejos. St. Joseph College-Olongapo, a college run by the Roman Catholic Church can be found in Olongapo City. The Columban College, run by the Catholic Church can be found also in Olongapo. The Magsaysay Memorial College is also run by the Roman Catholic Church and can be found in San Narciso.

Colleges and universities

 AIE College International (Olongapo City)
 AMA Computer College (Olongapo City)
 AMA Computer Learning Center (Olongapo City)
 Asian Institute of Computer Studies (Olongapo City)
 Best Freeport Colleges Inc. (Subic Bay Freeport Zone)
 Polytechnic College of Botolan (Botolan)
 Capstone Institute of Business and Arts (Olongapo City)
 Central Luzon College of Science and Technology (Olongapo City)
 College of Subic Montessori Subic Bay (Subic Bay Freeport Zone)
 Collegio de Castillejos (Castillejos)
 Columban College - Barreto Campus (Olongapo City)
 Columban College - Santa Cruz Campus (Santa Cruz)
 Columban College - Main Campus (Olongapo City)
 Comteq Computer and Business College (Subic Bay Freeport Zone)
 Don Bosco College of Zambales (Castillejos)
 Don Luis Orin Junior College of Criminology, Inc. (Iba)
 First EDT Learning Center, Inc. (Subic Bay Freeport Zone)
 Freeport SBLC Inc. (Subic Bay Freeport Zone)
 GIS Institute of Technology Phils Inc. (San Marcelino)
 Global City Innovative College Subic (Olongapo City)
 Gordon College (Olongapo City)
 Holy Infant Jesus College(Olongapo City)
 Hopeful Beginnings Institute (Iba)
 Keystone Subic International Language Center (Subic Bay Freeport Zone)
 Kolehiyo ng Subic (Subic)
 Lorraine Technical School (Olongapo City)
 Lyceum of Subic Bay (Subic Bay Freeport Zone)
 Magsaysay Memorial College (San Narciso)
 Metro Subic Colleges (Olongapo City)
 Micro Asia College of Science and Technology (Santa Cruz)
 Micro Asia College of Science and Technology (Iba)
 Mondrian Aura College (Subic Bay Freeport Zone)
 Network Computer and Business Colleges (Olongapo City)
 Northern Zambales College (Masinloc)
 Philippine Merchants Marine Academy  (San Narciso)
 President Ramon Magsaysay State University - Candelaria (Candelaria)
 President Ramon Magsaysay State University - Castillejos (Castillejos)
 President Ramon Magsaysay State University - Main Campus (Iba)
 President Ramon Magsaysay State University - Masinloc (Masinloc)
 President Ramon Magsaysay State University - Western Luzon Agricultural College (San Marcelino)
 San Antonio Institute of Commerce and Technology (San Antonio)
 Sand Valley Institute of Arts and Trades (Iba)
 St. Benilde Center for Global Competence (Olongapo City)
 St. Joseph College (Olongapo City)
 St. Nicolas Systeq College (Palauig)
 St. Theresa's College - (San Marcelino)
 STI College (Olongapo City)
 Subic Bay Foreign Language Center (Subic Bay Freeport Zone)
 Subic Bay Metropolitan Authority Law Enforcement Academy (Subic Bay Freeport Zone)
 Subic Bay Colleges Inc. - (Iba)
 Subic Institute of International Studies (Subic Bay Freeport Zone)
 Technological College of San Felipe (San Felipe)
 The Thomasites Center for International Studies (Subic Bay Freeport Zone)
 University of the Philippines - Extension Program in Olongapo (Subic Bay Freeport Zone)
 Virgen de los Remedios College (Olongapo City)
 Virgin de los Remedios College of Criminology (Iba)
 Zambales Academy  (San Narciso)
 Zambales Lifesaving Inc. PCG Accredited Lifeguard training organization (Botolan)

President Ramon Magsaysay State University (PRMSU) The President Ramon Magsaysay State University, commonly referred to as PRMSU, is a state university/government-funded higher education institution in  Iba, established in 1910. The university is named after former President Ramon Magsaysay, a native of the province. Its main campus is situated in the capital town of Iba, while satellite campuses are located in Santa Cruz, Candelaria, Masinloc, Botolan, San Marcelino, and Castillejos. The university also offers nursing courses at the Mondriaan Aura College in Subic Bay Freeport Zone, Business Administration at the Wesleyan College of Manila under a consortium program.

 Columban College, Olongapo The Columban College, is a private-catholic educational institution in Zambales that was established in 1961. the college was founded by the missionaries from Ireland under the Missionary Society of St. Columban until they turn over the institution to the Diocese of Iba. the institution's main campus is situated at the heart of Olongapo City, other campuses situated at Bo. Barretto, Olongapo which focuses on the southern part of Zambales, and Santa Cruz, Zambales which focuses on the northern part of Zambales. they value Christian Character like any other Catholic Schools as a Christ-centered but competing institution. they offer academic programs within their reach.

Notable people

 Gerald Anderson
Norman Balbuena a.k.a. Boobay
Megan Young
Elmer Borlongan
Rafael Corpus
Hermogenes Ebdane
Loi Ejercito
Richard J. Gordon
Luz Magsaysay
Mitos Magsaysay
Ramon Magsaysay
Ramon Magsaysay Jr.
Lou Diamond Phillips
Isabel Rivas
Dennis Roldan
Ruben Torres
Teodoro R. Yangco
Sarah Elago
Freddie Aguilar
K Brosas
Gladys Guevarra
Wowie de Guzman
Kristofer Martin
Blakdyak
Willie Miller
Topex Robinson
Arnel Pineda
Angelee delos Reyes
Lauren Young
Tom Rodriguez
Angelu de Leon 
Raikko Mateo
Ruby Rodriguez
Jay Washington
Rico Barrera
Bea Alonzo

References

External links

 
 
 Baluate Ng Sambal 
  Olongapo city news archive]

 
Provinces of the Philippines
Provinces of Central Luzon
States and territories established in 1578
1578 establishments in the Philippines